Alistair Milne (born October 1977) is a British entrepreneur and investor. He is the founder of Altana Digital Currency Fund, founded in 2014.

Biography
Milne founded his first company aged 17, also working for AOL in 1996. Shortly after graduating from UMIST in 1999, Milne sold The Junction Web business to Stream Group Plc in 2000. Milne has founded and sold several companies since then, including one IPO on the AIM stock exchange.

Milne co-founded Evosite in 2001 and is responsible for business strategy and development as well as financial management. He has also invested in Oxis Energy, Agriya, i-Fluid, GRIDiant and Hello! Messenger.

According to Peerindex, Milne is in the top 100 VC's & Business Angels on Twitter He publishes books and advice under the Startup Expert name. brand.

References

External links
Alistair Milne's Official Site

1977 births
Living people
Alumni of the University of Manchester Institute of Science and Technology
British expatriates in Monaco
Irish expatriates in Monaco
Scottish businesspeople